Lalawmpuia  is an Indian professional footballer who plays as a goalkeeper for Aizawl in the I-League.

Career
Born in Mizoram, Lalawmpuia played for Zo United in the Mizoram Premier League and earned the best goalkeeper award after the 2015 season. He then joined Aizawl in the I-League and made his professional debut for them on 26 March 2016 against reigning champions, Mohun Bagan. He played the full-match as Aizawl won 2–1.

Career statistics

References

Living people
Indian footballers
Aizawl FC players
Association football defenders
Footballers from Mizoram
Mizoram Premier League players
I-League players
Year of birth missing (living people)